Alexx Calise (born June 28, 1985), is an American singer, songwriter, and musician. She is best known for her solo work and her other musical project (with songwriting partner Dennis Morehouse), Batfarm.

Biography
Alexx Calise was born on June 28, 1985 in Staten Island, New York, but grew up in Fort Lauderdale, Florida. An avid writer, she began playing the guitar at age 11 to emulate her father, who is also a musician. Calise began pursuing her professional music career at the age of 14.

She now resides in Los Angeles, California where she writes and performs her own solo material, and pens songs for other high-profile artists. Calise's original music has appeared in several television shows such as Dance Moms, Dance Moms: Miami, Abby's Ultimate Dance Competition, Grimm, NY Ink, Last Call with Carson Daly, One Tree Hill, Next, Tough Love, CrossFit Games and more. Her song, "Release Me" was also chosen as the title track for the 2011 film, L.A., I Hate You, starring William Forsythe, Malcolm McDowell and Deedee Pfieffer, which was distributed by Universal Pictures. She also lent her voice to a Coachella Music Festival short (music written by Matt O'Malley of human) directed by Sam O'Hare.

Calise is probably best known for her song, "Cry", which enjoyed heavy rotation on Lifetime's Dance Moms and has gone on to sell hundreds of thousands of units independently. "Cry" peaked at No. 64 on the iTunes rock charts in August 2011, and its official music video also features Dance Moms star, Maddie Ziegler, who danced to the song in several episodes of the show.

Calise is also an actress, and has appeared in several national TV commercials and shows including the Discovery Channel documentary, The Science of Sex Appeal, Disney's Science of Imagineering DVD series, and most recently, a series of national Guitar Center commercials.

Calise and her band recently performed her song "Cry" on season 7 of Dance Moms with Nia Sioux and Kendall Vertes. Calise also released her single, "Breathe," which featured Nia Sioux on vocals on the same day as the episode's airing.

Calise is currently working on new music for her solo project and her band Batfarm, as well as hosting for Guitar World magazine and writing for a variety of music publications.

Interviews
Calise has been interviewed by The Wall Street Journal, Examiner.com, Guitar Player, Blender, Guitar World, Louis Velazquez of UCW Radio, Outloud Multimedia, Hard Drivin' Radio, Paul and Young Ron of Big 106 FM, Empowerment4women.com, Broward New Times, Sun-Sentinel, Miami Community News, and more. She was also interviewed in the nationally distributed how-to/method book, How to Succeed as a Female Musician (Alfred Publishing), which features such notable musicians as Lisa Loeb and the Donnas), and more.

Charity work
Calise is involved with the Wear Your Music Foundation, an organization that produces jewelry from high-profile artists' guitar strings. All sales from Calise's bracelets are donated to the Brain Trauma Foundation.

Discography
"Pull It (Bullet)" (single) (2007)
"Morning Pill" (2007)
"In Avanti" (2010)
"No Vampires In Gilroy" (2011) (with other group, Sound of Cancer—now Batfarm)
"Outta Here Alive" (single) (2012)
"AC3" EP (2012) 
"Home Again" (single) (2013)
"All Night Long" (single) (2013)
"The Catalyst: B-Sides" (2015)
"Addition by Subtraction" (2015)
"Breathe" (single) (2017)
"Rise" feat. Sensitive Robot (single) (2019)

References

External links
 
 
 
 
 
 Alexx Calise Interview with The Jitty
 UpVenue interview with Alexx Calise

Living people
1985 births
American women singer-songwriters
American rock songwriters
Musicians from Fort Lauderdale, Florida
Writers from Los Angeles
Writers from Fort Lauderdale, Florida
American women rock singers
Singer-songwriters from California
Singer-songwriters from Florida
Guitarists from Los Angeles
Guitarists from Florida
21st-century American women singers
21st-century American singers
21st-century American women guitarists
21st-century American guitarists